Bembidion antiquum is a species of ground beetle in the subfamily Trechinae. It is found in Canada and the United States.

References

Further reading

External links

 

antiquum
Beetles described in 1831
Taxa named by Pierre François Marie Auguste Dejean